Columbarium is a genus of deepwater sea snails, marine gastropod molluscs in the family Turbinellidae, the pagoda shells.

The shells of most species in this family have a long siphonal canal and a noticeable peripheral keel.

Species
Species within the genus Columbarium include:
 Columbarium alfi Thach, 2020
 Columbarium altocanalis (Dell, 1956)
  † Columbarium antecedens Pacaud, 2015
 Columbarium bullatum (Dall, 1927)
 Columbarium corollaceoum Zhang, 2003
 Columbarium formosissimum Tomlin, 1928
 Columbarium harrisae Harasewych, 1986
 Columbarium hedleyi Iredale, 1936
 Columbarium hystriculum Iredale, 1936
 Columbarium mariae (Powell, 1952)
 Columbarium natalense Tomlin, 1928
 Columbarium pagoda Lesson, 1831
 Columbarium pagodoides (Watson, 1882)
 † Columbarium pataka Maxwell, 1978 
 Columbarium quadrativaricosum Harasewych, 2004
 Columbarium sinense Zhang, 2003
 Columbarium spinicinctum von Martens, 1881
 Columbarium spiralis (A. Adams, 1856)
 Columbarium subcontractum Zhang, 2003
 Columbarium suzukii Habe & Kosuge, 1972
 Columbarium veridicum Dell, 1963
 † Columbarium vulneratum (Finlay & Marwick, 1937) 
 Columbarium wormaldi Powell, 1971

Synonyms:
 Columbarium aapta Harasewych, 1986 is a synonym of  Coluzea aapta Harasewych, 1986
 Columbarium angulare Barnard, 1959 is a synonym of Coluzea angularis (Barnard, 1959)
 Columbarium atlantis Clench & Aguayo, 1938 is a synonym of Histricosceptrum atlantis (Clench & Aguayo, 1938)
 Columbarium aurora Bayer, 1971 is a synonym of Peristarium aurora (Bayer, 1971)
 Columbarium bartletti Clench & Aguayo, 1940 is a synonym of Histricosceptrum bartletti (Clench & Aguayo, 1940)
 Columbarium benthocallis Melvill & Standen, 1907is a synonym of Fulgurofusus benthocallis (Melvill & Standen, 1907)
 Columbarium bermudezi Clench & Aguayo, 1938 is a synonym of Fulgurofusus bermudezi (Clench & Aguayo, 1938)
 Columbarium berthae Monsecour & Kreipl, 2003 is a synonym of Coluzea berthae (Monsecour & Kreipl, 2003)
 Columbarium brayi Clench, 1959 is a synonym of Fulgurofusus brayi (Clench, 1959)
 Columbarium canaliculatum Martens, 1901 is a synonym of Coluzea canaliculatum (Martens, 1901)
 Columbarium congulatum Martens, 1901 is a synonym of Coluzea cingulata (Martens, 1901)
 Columbarium coronatum Penna-Neme & Leme, 1978 is a synonym of Coronium coronatum (Penna-Neme & Leme, 1978)
 Columbarium distephanotis Melvill, 1891 is a synonym of Coluzea distephanotis (Melvill, 1891)
 Columbarium eastwoodae Kilburn, 1971 is a synonym of Coluzea eastwoodae (Kilburn, 1971)
 Columbarium electra Bayer, 1971is a synonym of Peristarium electra (Bayer, 1971)
 Columbarium juliae is a synonym of Coluzea juliae Harasewych, 1989 
 Columbarium merope Bayer, 1971 is a synonym of Peristarium merope (Bayer, 1971)
 Columbarium radiale is a synonym of Coluzea radialis (Watson, 1882) 
 Columbarium rotundum Barnard, 1959 is a synonym of Coluzea rotunda (Barnard, 1959)
 Columbarium suteri E.A. Smith, 1915 is a synonym of Coluzea spiralis (A. Adams, 1856)
 Columbarium trabeatum Iredale, 1936 is a synonym of Columbarium hedleyi Iredale, 1936

References

Further reading
 Harasewych M. G. (1983). "A Review of the Columbariinae (Gastropoda: Turbinellidae) of the Western Atlantic With Notes on the Anatomy and Systematic Relationships of the Subfamily". Nemouria 27: 1-42, (Occasional Papers of the Delaware Museum of Natural History).
 The Columbariinae (Gastropoda: Turbinellidae) of the eastern Indian Ocean, by M.G. Harasewych, Journal of the Malacological Society of Australia 7(3-4): 155–170, 1986
 Harasewych M. G. (1983). "A New Species of Columbarium (Gastropoda: Muricacea) From Off Eastern Australia". The Nautilus 97(1): 28–29.
 Harasewych M. G. (2011). "The living Columbariinae (Gastropoda: Neogastropoda: Turbinellidae) of New Zealand". Zootaxa 2744: 1-33.

Turbinellidae